Jean-Claude Ellena (born 1947, Grasse, France) is a French perfumer and writer.

Career
At an early age, Ellena picked jasmine with his grandmother in Grasse to sell to perfumers. 
Beginning with menial jobs, he became an apprentice at the factory of the essential oils maker Antoine Chiris in Grasse at the age 16 working on the night shift. He has reminisced, "Among other essential oils, we made a lot of oakmoss, and after I’d put the distiller on, I’d lie down on a bed of it and sleep".

In 1968, he became the first student at what was at the time the newly formed perfumery school of Givaudan, one of the oldest perfume factories, in Geneva, Switzerland. He left Givaudan in 1976 with two others perfumers for Lautier in Grasse. In 1983, he joined Givaudan Paris as chief perfumer and Roure-Givandan and then he worked at Haarmaan & Reimer in Paris (which merged in 2003 with Dragoco to form Symrise). In 1990, he became one of the founding members of the Osmothèque, an international scent archive based in Versailles.

Ellena has been profoundly influenced by pioneering perfumer Edmond Roudnitska, particularly by his article, "Advice to a Young Perfumer", in a magazine given to him by his father.

Between 2004 and 2016 he was Hermès's exclusive in-house perfumer, appointed by Jean-Louis Dumas and Véronique Gautier. He has created fragrances for several major perfume houses including The Different Company, which he founded before joining Hermès. His daughter Céline Ellena now creates for The Different Company.

In 2005, Ellena created Un Jardin sur le Nil for Hermès. The story behind the creation of this fragrance was the subject of the book The Perfect Scent: A Year in the Perfume Industry in Paris and New York by Chandler Burr. In addition, the story in a limited form and accounts of other scents as well as his autobiography has been published in Perfume: The Alchemy of Scent. He is also a writer of "The Diary of a Nose: A Year in the Life of a Parfumeur."

Since 2019, Jean Claude Ellena became the exclusive Olfactory Creation Director of Le Couvent – Maison de Parfum. He created for (and with) Le Couvent a contemporary Haute Parfumerie rich and unique, luxurious and accessible, made from of noble and rare natural materials, 100% vegan: « Creating a Singular Haute Parfumerie accessible to all, working with beautiful materials and noble essences, is what seduced me at the Couvent. This vision of the extraordinary perfume that we share. A new approach, different from what we generally find. » J.C. Ellena

Notable Works

For Hermès
 Hermèssence collection (exclusively in Hermès stores)
Rose Ikebana (2004)
Osmanthe Yunnan (2005)
Brin de Réglisse (2007)
Vétiver Tonka (2004)
Vanille Galante (2009)
Paprika Brasil (2006)
Santal Massoïa (2011)
Ambre Narguilé (2004)
Iris Ukiyoé (2010)
Poivre Samarcande (2006)
Épice Marine (2013)
Cuir d’Ange (2014)
Muguet Porcelaine (2016)
 Rocabar (1998), with Gilles Romey and Bernard Bourgeois
 Un Jardin en Méditerranée (2003)
 Un Jardin sur le Nil (2005)
 Elixir des Merveilles (2006)
 Terre d'Hermès (2006)
 Kelly Calèche (2007)
 Un Jardin après la Mousson (2008)
 Kelly Calèche Parfum (2008)
 Kelly Calèche Eau de Parfum (2009)
 Eau de Gentiane Blanche (2009)
 Eau de Pamplemousse Rose (2009)
 Eau Claire des Merveilles (2010)
 Voyage d'Hermès (2010)
 Un Jardin sur le Toit (2011)
 Voyage d'Hermes Perfume (2012)
 Jour d'Hermes (2012)
 L’Ambre des Merveilles (2012)
 Bel Ami Vetiver (2013)
 Jour d'Hermes Extrait de Parfum (2013)
 Jour d'Hermes Absolue (2014)
 Le Jardin de Monsieur Li (2015)
 Eau de Neroli Dore (2016)

For Le Couvent-Maison de Parfum
 Collection les Parfums Signature 
Mimosa (2021)
Tuberosa (2021)
Ambra (2021)
Vetivera (2022)
 Collection les Eaux de Parfum Singulieres, en tant que Directeur de Création Olfactive
 Nubica (2019)
 Lysandra (2019)
 Hattaï (2019)
 Saïga (2019)
 Heliaca (2019)
 Theria (2021)
 Agapi (2022)
 Collection les Eaux de Parfum Remarquables, en tant que Directeur de Création Olfactive
 Tinhare (2019)
 Kythnos (2019)
 Palmarola (2019)
 Anori (2019)
 Solano (2019)
 Collection les Colognes Botaniques, en tant que Directeur de Création Olfactive
 Aqua Majestae (2019)
 Aqua Imperi (2019)
 Aqua Nymphae (2019)
 Aqua Millefolia (2020)
 Aqua Amantia (2020)
 Aqua Mahana (2022)

For Bulgari
 Eau Parfumée au Thé Vert (1992)
 Eau Parfumée au Thé Vert Extrême (1996)

For Frédéric Malle
 Angéliques sous la Pluie (2000)
 Cologne Bigarade (2001)
 Bigarade Concentrée (2002)
 L'Eau d'Hiver (2003)
 Rose & Cuir (2019)

For L'Artisan Parfumeur
 L'Eau d'Ambre (1978)
 La Haie Fleurie du Hameau (1982)
 Ambre Extrême (2001)
 Bois Farine (2003)

For Van Cleef & Arpels
 First (1976)
 Miss Arpels (1994)

For The Different Company
 Bois d’Iris (2000)
 Osmanthus (2001)
 Rose Poivrée (2001)
 Bergamote (formerly Divine Bergamote) (2003)

For Perris Monte Carlo
 Rose de Mai (2019)
 Jasmin de Pays (2019)
 Mimosa Tanneron (2020)
 Lavande Romaine (2020)

Others
 Essence Rare (1973 and 2018), for Houbigant 
 Eau de Campagne (1974), for Sisley
 Rumba (1988), with Ron Winnegrad, for Balenciaga
 Globe (1990), for Rochas
 Déclaration (1998), for Cartier
 In Love Again (1998), for Yves Saint Laurent
 Aromantic (1999), for Decléor
 Bazar Femme (2002), with Bertrand Duchaufour & Emilie Copperman, for Christian Lacroix
 Blanc (2003), for Paul & Joe
 Colonia Assoluta (2003), with Bertrand Duchaufour, for Acqua di Parma
 Emporio Armani Night for Her (2003), with Lucas Sieuzac, for Giorgio Armani
 Eau de Lalique, with Emilie Copperman, for Lalique
 Amouage Dia pour Femme, for Amouage

After Hermes
Ellena left Hermes in 2016, and Swiss-born chemist and perfumer Christine Nagel replaced him as Hermes in-house perfumer. Ellena's final fragrances for Hermes were Eau de Néroli Doré and Hermèssence Muguet Porcelaine.

In 2018 Ellena worked with the House of Houbigant, to recreate Essence Rare, a fragrance he had first signed in 1973, his first assignment as a young perfumer in New York.

Ellena returned to creating for Editions de Parfum Frederic Malle, his latest work, "Rose & Cuir," debuting in September 2019. He also became the olfactive director of the brand Le Couvent des Minimes.

In 2019 Ellena also started an ongoing collaboration with Perris Monte Carlo, for whom he has created the Collection de Grasse, an exclusive fragrance collection paying tribute to the history and unique craftmanship of the art of perfumery in Pays de Grasse.

Since 2019, Jean Claude Ellena is the Olfactory creation director of Le Couvent – Maison de Parfum. he created for and with Le Couvent a contemporary Haute Parfumerie rich and unique, luxurious and accessible, made from of noble and rare natural materials, 100% vegan: « Creating a Singular Haute Parfumerie accessible to all, working with beautiful materials and noble essences, is what seduced me at the Couvent. This vision of the extraordinary perfume that we share. A new approach, different from what we generally find. » J.C. Ellena

Personal life
Ellena's father, brother, and daughter Celine are also perfumers. Known for his signature white shirts, Ellena himself never wears perfume or cologne.
His daughter Celine designed the Hermès Home Fragrance Collection.

References

External links
 The Different Company  
 Chandler Burr, Scent of the Nile: Jean-Claude Ellena creates a new perfume, New Yorker, 15 March 2005.
 Amouage Perfumes
 Le Couvent-Maison de Parfum

People from Grasse
French perfumers
Living people
1947 births